Delaware re-elected its sole member October 7, 1828.

See also 
 1828 and 1829 United States House of Representatives elections
 List of United States representatives from Delaware

1828
Delaware
United States House of Representatives